Clelandella artilesi is a species of sea snail, a marine gastropod mollusk in the family Trochidae, the top snails.

Distribution
This species occurs in the Atlantic Ocean off the Western Sahara.

References

External links
 To World Register of Marine Species
 Vilvens C., Swinnen F. & Deniz Guerra F. (2011) A new species of Clelandella (Gastropoda: Trochoidea: Cantharidinae) from Western Sahara. Novapex 12(1-2): 49-55.

artilesi
Gastropods described in 2011